Lamoille (also spelled La Moille) is an unincorporated community in Richmond Township, Winona County, Minnesota, United States.  Big Trout Creek and the Mississippi River meet at Lamoille.

Geography
The community is located 9 miles southeast of Winona along Highways 61 and 14, at the junction with Winona County Road 7. Great River Bluffs State Park and Interstate 90 are also nearby. Other nearby places include Winona, Homer, Pickwick, Donehower, Dakota, and Dresbach.

History
Lamoille took its name from the Lamoille River and Lamoille County in Vermont.  It developed at a point where a stagecoach route crossed the Mississippi River and the community was platted in 1860.  Lamoille had a post office from 1858 to 1975.

References

Unincorporated communities in Minnesota
Unincorporated communities in Winona County, Minnesota
Minnesota populated places on the Mississippi River